Frank Charles Hindley (2 November 1915 – 26 March 2003) was an English professional footballer who played as a centre forward in the Football League for Nottingham Forest and Brighton & Hove Albion either side of the Second World War. He made his Brighton debut in the first of two appearances in the 1939–40 Football League season abandoned, along with its statistics and records, on the outbreak of war. He made a few appearances for Peterborough United in the first post-war season of the Midland League, then returned to Brighton for a season before retiring from the game.

Hindley was born in Worksop, Nottinghamshire, in 1915 and died there in 2003. His son Peter played more than 500 Football League matches for Nottingham Forest, Coventry City and Peterborough United in the 1960s and 1970s.

References

1915 births
2003 deaths
Footballers from Worksop
English footballers
Association football forwards
Nottingham Forest F.C. players
Brighton & Hove Albion F.C. players
Peterborough United F.C. players
English Football League players
Midland Football League players
Nottingham Forest F.C. wartime guest players
Mansfield Town F.C. wartime guest players